Vir pri Nevljah is a small settlement on the Nevljica River in the Municipality of Kamnik in the Upper Carniola region of Slovenia. It is a few houses on the road through the Tuhinj Valley between the settlements of Podhruška and Soteska.

Name
The name of the settlement was changed from Vir to Vir pri Nevljah in 1953.

References

External links

Vir pri Nevljah on Geopedia

Populated places in the Municipality of Kamnik